Farlowella mitoupibo is a species of catfish in the family Loricariidae. It is native to South America, where it occurs in the upper Guaviare River, which is part of the Orinoco basin in Colombia. The species reaches at least 20.96 cm (8.3 inches) in standard length. It was described in 2016 by Gustavo A. Ballen (of the University of London), Alexander Urbano-Bonilla (of the Pontifical Xavierian University), and Jhon Zamudio (also of the Pontifical Xavierian University). Its specific name, mitoupibo, is derived from the Guahibo name for the species. FishBase does not yet list this species.

References 

mitoupibo
Fish described in 2016
Catfish of South America
Fish of Colombia